Benjamín "Benito" Pertuzzo (born 2 March 1905, date of death unknown) was an Argentine boxer who competed in the 1924 Summer Olympics. In 1924 he was eliminated in the quarter-finals of the bantamweight class after losing his fight to the upcoming silver medalist Salvatore Tripoli.

References

External links
profile

1905 births
Year of death missing
Bantamweight boxers
Olympic boxers of Argentina
Boxers at the 1924 Summer Olympics
Argentine male boxers